Yuki Okochi (born 15 September 2000) is a Japanese professional footballer who plays as a defender for WE League club AC Nagano Parceiro.

Club career 
Okochi made her WE League debut on 16 October 2021.

References 

Living people
2000 births
Women's association football defenders
WE League players
Japanese women's footballers
Association football people from Hokkaido
AC Nagano Parceiro Ladies players